Yaku may refer to:
 Yakushima, Japan (屋久島), which could be referred to as Yaku Island
 Yaku, Kagoshima, Japan (屋久町), a town on the island of Yakushima in Kagoshima Prefecture
Yaku, Nepal
A specific combination of tiles or cards that increases the value of the player's hand in Japanese Mahjong or Koi-Koi
Yaku, an unusual low-pressure system in the far Southeastern Pacific that impacted Ecuador and Peru in March 2023
Yaku (Haida village), an historical village on Haida Gwaii, British Columbia, Canada
 Yaku Yakusen, a character from The 100 Girlfriends Who Really Really Really Really Really Love You